The Uliches or Ugliches ( or ;  or ,  or ;  ,  or ) were a tribe of Early East Slavs who, between the eighth and the tenth centuries, inhabited (along with the Tivertsi) Bessarabia, and the territories along the Lower Dnieper, Bug River and the Black Sea littoral.

Ethnonym
The tribal name comes from a location called Oglos or Onglos by the Byzantine chroniclers Theophanes the Confessor and Nikephoros I of Constantinople, possibly to be identified with Peuce Island. The word may derive from Slavic âgul 'corner', or, according to Steven Runciman, from agul 'enclosure'.

History
They were mentioned as Unlizi by the Bavarian Geographer, described as "populus multus" and having 418 gords-settlements. The Uliches long struggled against the Kievan princes Oleg, Igor and Sviatoslav Igorevich for their independence, until a Kievan commander Sveneld captured their capital, Peresechen (near Orhei, in present-day Moldova), around 940. In the mid-10th century the Ulich lands paid tribute to Sveneld. The Uliches were last mentioned in the 970s.

See also
Hutsuls
List of Medieval Slavic tribes

References 
 
 

 
Moldova in the Early Middle Ages
Ulich